The Writers Guild of America Award for Television: Documentary Script – Current Events is an award presented by the Writers Guild of America to the best writing in a documentary about current events. It was first awarded at the 41st Writers Guild of America Awards, being the episode "Apartheid Part 5: 1987" from the American program Frontline the inaugural winner of the category.

Winners and nominees

1980s

1990s

2000s

2010s

2020s

Programs with multiple awards
26 awards
 Frontline (PBS)

Programs with multiple nominations
 77 nominations
 Frontline (PBS)

 6 nominations
 Nova (PBS)

2 nominations
 Primetime Live (ABC)
 The Awful Truth (Bravo)
 Agents of Chaos (HBO)
 Dateline NBC (NBC)

See also
 Primetime Emmy Award for Outstanding Writing for a Nonfiction Programming

References

American documentary film awards
Writers Guild of America Awards